Volvo Cross Country C303, (Tgb 11, A.K.A "Terrängbil 11", translated as "Terrain Vehicle 11"), is the base model of a range of military vehicles produced by Volvo.

The car was developed in the late 60s based on the successful L3314 series and went into production in 1974. This version was produced both as a 4x4 and a 6x6. An 8x8 was planned but dropped. Engines were the B30 (B20 in the prototypes) from Volvo's civilian cars. The C3 series feature portal axles with locking differentials resulting in very high ground-clearance (similar to the Unimog) and outstanding performance offroad. The cars are narrow to make it possible to navigate between trees and on narrow forest roads.

They were also sold to civilian customers for rescue services, electricity companies etc. and private use. In the Swedish army the vehicles are designated "Terrängbil xx" (or "Tgb" for short) where "xx" is a number defining the type of vehicle. See table below.

In the 1983 Paris-Dakar rally a Volvo C303 won the class for trucks under 10 tonnes.

A total of 8,718 vehicles of the C3 series were made. Roughly 75% of these went into military service, with the remaining sold to civilian contracts. It was used by the Malaysian Army c. 1970–1990, the Royal Malaysian Police, and civilian users like Telekom Malaysia c. 1980s.

Variants
4x4 versions (C303)
Tgb 11, basic hardtop model
Tgb 1111, soft-top model, fitted with the Pvpj 1110 90 mm recoilless antitank gun.
Tgb 1112, hardtop model equipped with an array of radio and telephone equipment
6x6 versions (C304)
Tgb 13, basic hardtop model
Tgb 1313, hardtop model equipped with an array of radio and telephone equipment, much larger than the Tgb 1112
Tgb 1314, hardtop model designed as an ambulance
Tgb 1321, hardtop model equipped with radios, usually used to choreograph artillery batteries
6x6 versions (C306)
Tgb 21, troop carrier, with room for up to 19 soldiers
Tgb 22, troop carrier (11 soldiers) and transport for RBS 70 anti-aircraft missile

Data
Top speed: about 
Engine: Volvo B30A petrol
Power:  at 4200 rpm at 4000 rpm for the military editions
Torque:  at 2500 rpm  at 2500 rpm for the military editions
Weight:
C303/tgb 11: , total 
C304/Tgb 13: , total 
C306/Tgb 20: , total 
Dimensions:
C303/Tgb 11: length , width , height 
C304/Tgb 13: length , width , height 
C306/Tgb 20: length , width , height 
Volume 2,982 litres
Leaf springs rear and front
Brakes: Drums on all wheels
dual, semi-redundant system, dual vacuum servo assist
Tyres: 8.90"×16", 285/80-16 or 9.00"×16"
Fuel tank: 85 litres

Military
 : Used by the People's Armed Forces for the Liberation of Angola
 : Used by the Military of Estonia
 : Used by the Latvian Land Forces
 : Used by the Lithuanian Land Forces
 : Used by the Malaysian Army (c. 1970–1990), Royal Malaysian Police
 : Used by the Swedish Army

Civilian users
 Telekom Malaysia (c. 1980s).
 Vägverket, the Swedish public roads administration.
 Vattenfall, the then Swedish state owned power company.
 SSRS, The Swedish ideal sea rescue society.
 Numerous fire brigades in Sweden.

See also
Pinzgauer High-Mobility All-Terrain Vehicle
Unimog
Land Rover 101 Forward Control
UAZ SGR

References

External links

Detailed technical data for military series
Swedish site with Tgb11 pictures and specifications
Pictures and information about Volvo C303

C303
Military trucks of Sweden
Military vehicles of the Cold War
Military vehicles introduced in the 1970s
Cab over off-road vehicles